The Salerno Apartments are a historic apartment building in Portland, Oregon, United States. Built in 1929–1930 in the Mediterranean Revival style, its courtyard evokes "a quiet street in an old Mediterranean town". Architect Carl L. Linde experimented with garden court-type apartments in the nearby 1929 Sorrento Apartments, and perfected the form in the Salerno building.

The building was entered on the National Register of Historic Places in 1994.

See also
National Register of Historic Places listings in Northeast Portland, Oregon

References

External links

Oregon Historic Sites Database entry

1930 establishments in Oregon
Apartment buildings on the National Register of Historic Places in Portland, Oregon
Carl L. Linde buildings
Kerns, Portland, Oregon
Mediterranean Revival architecture in Oregon
Portland Historic Landmarks
Residential buildings completed in 1930